is a Japanese seinen manga series written and illustrated by Minori Inaba. It was published by Shueisha, with serialization in Weekly Young Jump magazine from September 15, 2011, until its conclusion on September 5, 2019. It is compiled into a total of sixteen volumes.

It is published in French by Soleil and in German by Panini Comics.

Plot
Terumi Minamoto is a young man born with a feminine face and is considered pretty enough to make people think he's a girl. Because of this, Terumi's middle school years were beset by bullying, spearheaded by the most popular and beautiful girl at the time, Chuujou Tsukasa, as an act of jealousy. Due to multiple acts of forcing Terumi to cross dress, as well as bathing him in sour milk, Terumi developed a fear of women and a hatred of milk due to the trauma. The long term consequence of this also resulted in Terumi never getting intimate with women during his high school years, finding even the act of talking with a woman awkward and painful. Just as he enters Shiun University and makes a promise to himself to overcome the trauma of his past, his father remarries and asks him to move out of the house. Terumi is arranged to live with his aunt, Kaoruko Fujiwara, for the time being. She is an extremely beautiful and talented young woman, who is also a non-tenured professor at his college. When he arrives at her apartment, she drags him into a special project in which he must seduce fourteen different women in the same fashion of the protagonist of The Tale of Genji.

As the story progresses over the span of two years in-universe, Kaoruko introduces Terumi to women who share their namesake with characters from "The Tale of Genji", including his cousin (who happens to be the first); Terumi slowly but surely starts to drop his awkwardness and fear towards the opposite sex. With each woman that he meets, Terumi learns to identify the target's quirks/problems, get them to open up to him and ultimately end up having intercourse with the woman in question. Increasing Terumi's prowess in sex is Kaoruko herself, who is willing to use her body and knowledge of a woman's mind to make Terumi more privy to sexual acts, though she and Terumi never commit incestuous intercourse and stop before it goes too far. Kaoruko also notes that due to Terumi losing his biological mother at such a young age, he has developed a Oedipus complex, explaining why Terumi is drawn to older women and why he enjoys engaging in sexual acts with his aunt. Due to the experiment, however, Terumi is able to speak and sleep with woman closer to his own age. While there have been times during the experiment that Terumi had desired to stop in order to pursue a more serious relationship with the woman in question, circumstances pop up where the relationship comes to an end, forcing Terumi to continue, though at least maintaining a cordial friendship with the targets.

Terumi also meets up with his nemesis, Tsukasa, at the same university. Thanks to Kaoruko, Terumi discovers that Tsukasa is engaged in a loveless affair with the University's most popular and influential professor, Konoe. Desiring revenge against her, Terumi orchestrates events that breaks Tsukasa and Konoe up, with Terumi discovering that the object of his torment is not nearly as terrifying as he made her out to be, allowing him to take the first steps in overcoming his trauma. Terumi's actions in standing up for himself also results in Tsukasa developing feelings of affection for her former victim. Subsequent events, such as competing in a beauty pageant against one another, only increases these feelings, with Tsukasa eventually admitting to herself that Terumi has grown strong since their middle school days.

After sleeping and/or meeting with 13 targets of the experiment, Kaoruko reveals to Terumi that she is the final 14th target and conducted the experiment not only to further her own research but primarily to enrich Terumi's life experiences as a tribute to Terumi's mother, Kirino, who Kaoruko was close to. Desiring to increase her status and reputation away from Konoe's influence, Kaoruko tells Terumi that she will be moving away to another university but will gift her apartment to her nephew, encouraging him to grow and develop without her influence. As a final erotic experience, Kaoruko and Terumi cross the line with each other and commit incestuous sexual intercourse with one another. One year later, Terumi and the targets have moved on with their lives, all better people for it, with Terumi desiring to become a researcher of Genji's Works upon graduating, following in his aunt's footsteps. The final scene of the story showcases Terumi drinking milk without any problems, signifying that he has overcome his trauma and fear towards milk, women and Tsukasa at long last.

Characters

Main Characters

The main male protagonist, Terumi is a university student who was always bullied by girls since middle school because of his girlish appearance, thus he never got intimate with a woman. This all changes, when he moved to Kaoruko's house, where he is tasked by her to collaborate with her project of re-enacting The Tale of Genji in real life while losing his fear of women, in the occasion. His surname derives from the Minamoto clan that Hikaru Genji adopted for being demoted from the succession. Terumi's inner kindness and stubborn determination endear him to many women, allowing him to develop many friendships and even sleeping with the targets in question. Due to losing his mother at a young age, Terumi has a Oedipus complex, which Kaoruko stokes in order for him to engage with older females. During the final volume of the story, Terumi at long last crosses the line and sleeps with his aunt.

The main female protagonist, she is Terumi's aunt and a literature teacher at his university, specialized in researching The Tale of Genji. She recruits Terumi to participate in her experiment by seducing fourteen different women, each related to one of Genji's lovers from the tale. A quiet, beautiful, and mature woman herself, Kaoruko shows no bounds in helping Terumi to grow accustomed to the opposite sex, to the point of using her own body to it, despite the fact that they are aunt and nephew, and even takes his first kiss. At a young age, she chose not to be with a man but changed her mind in adulthood. There have been hints that she might have feelings for Terumi, though she is instead encouraging Terumi to be his own man. She is later revealed to be the fourteenth and final target, taking on the role of Fujitsubo from the Tale of Genji. During the final volume of the story, Kaoruko crosses the line and ends up sleeping with her nephew.

Targets

Labeled as "Targets" by Kaoruko, each one of them share some similarities with one of the women seduced by Hikaru Genji, and she instructs Terumi to get into relationships with them, for the sake of her research.

The first target and Terumi's cousin, she was close with him when they were kids, but drifted apart as the years went by. Her dream is to ultimately become a librarian, which she accomplishes at the end of the series. After reuniting with her again and several failed attempts to seduce her, Terumi settles on kissing his cousin compassionately when the opportunity arises, which over time, she grew to mind less and less. Hearing that she will only accept being his girlfriend if they do not have sex at all, Terumi refuses, noting it's too unreasonable a request. As Terumi moved on to the rest of the targets, she deals with bouts of jealously, eventually developing romantic feelings for him, though she is too scared and nervous to take their relationship any further. Her best friend is Tsukiko, who she confides her problems with and is a regular reader of her erotic novels. She never finds out the truth that Tsukiko and Terumi have slept with one another at one point. She's based on Asagao no Kimi from the Tale of Genji.

Kaoruko's friend and the second target, she owns her own nail salon and because of this, she is too busy to take care of her house chores, thus Terumi offers himself to be her assistant in order to get close to her. Terumi later discovers that Aoi has a father complex and although he later loses his virginity to her, it ends up being brief, as her complex hinders his attraction to her and kills the sexual mood between them when she starts screaming for her father during intercourse. They still remain on cordial terms, with Aoi taking it upon herself to hinder Miya from interfering with Terumi's life, as gratitude due to feeling that she and Terumi are similar for having complexes towards a parental figure. She is based on Aoi no Ue from the Tale of Genji.

The third target, Hanada works at a Soba Shop while studying Home Economics at Terumi's university. She is very conscious of her large breasts and thus is very shy around others. She eventually becomes Terumi's first real girlfriend, as well as the first with whom Terumi has sex properly. Terumi once considered stopping the Genji project in order to have a continuous relationship with her, but he ends up learning that despite enjoying his company, she does not truly love him, thus prompting him to move on with it. Thanks to her brief relationship with Terumi, Hanada has learned to grow a bit more assertive and take a bit of more pride in her breasts. It is hinted that she still has affections for Terumi but she never acts on them. She's based on Hanachirusato from the Tale of Genji.

The fourth target, Miya is a gorgeous, teacher who works at Terumi's university as the Information Processing Tutor. She once was Terumi's teacher at middle school and since then developed an unhealthy obsession with him, stalking Terumi when the opportunity arises and lining the walls of her apartment with photos of him. After spending some time living with her, Terumi leaves her in order to continue with the Genji project, a fact that she is aware of. She shows up time and again throughout the story, usually to "sabotage" any relationship Terumi has with other women, which requires Kaoruko stepping in to put Miya in her place. She is based on Lady Rokujo from the Tale of Genji.

The fifth target, Shian is a little girl with a very innocent, polite and cute personality. Kaoruko chose her because she wanted Terumi to become more used to younger women after his bad experience with Miya, and due to her similarities with Murasaki from the Tale of Genji. She adores Terumi's company, thinking of him as an older brother, eventually desiring to one day become an exceptional woman for Terumi to marry, a dream she shares with her best friend, Otome. Due to her age and innocence, Terumi cannot seduce her as he did with the other targets, instead aspiring to be a brother figure that Shian can look up to. She is based on Murasaki no Ue from the Tale of Genji.

The sixth target, Semi is a bespectacled attractive woman who works as a shop clerk at the university. Fond of drinking and stuck in a rut due to being involved in a loveless relationship with her apathetic boyfriend for a long time, Semi is unable to properly address her problems. This all changes when she spends quality time with Terumi, ultimately "cheating" on her boyfriend by sleeping with Terumi for the night. Though she doesn't take her relationship further with Terumi, it's implied that she breaks up with her boyfriend at long last, moving on with her life. She still holds affection for Terumi, however, hiding from him in embarrassment whenever he comes around the convenience store she works at. At the end of the series, she quits her job to work as a secretary under Gennai. 
She's based on Utsusemi from the Tale of Genji.

The seventh target, Yuu is a bright and cheerful young woman who works as a fitness instructor for interested parties, making up for lost time since she was always sickly as a young girl. Due to being bedridden most of her young life, this resulted in not having any experience at all with men, until meeting Terumi and becoming his first serious girlfriend, much to Miya's envy. Terumi's relationship with Yuu almost made him decide to quit the Genji project for her sake, but after receiving a job proposal that she couldn't refuse, as well as believing that Terumi had deeper feelings for his aunt, Kaoruko, she is forced to move to Osaka and end the relationship. Though, she later reveals that she is still in love with Terumi but never makes an attempt to resume a relationship. Towards the end of the series, she is still working as a fitness instructor, last seen trying to get Akashi to join the gym. She plays the role as Yuugao from Tale of Genji.

The eighth target, Hana is a short, but well-endowed sophomore in the broadcasting department at Terumi's university, who aspires to become a voice actress. Hana is desperate to make friends around her age, since she has a troubled time doing so due to her shyness and high pitch voice. Looking for a partner for an audition practice in an eroge video game, Kaoruko recommends Terumi for the task, with the intent of getting them close. It works, as this allows her to open up to Terumi, eventually ending with the both of them sleeping with one another as "practice". Grateful for the experience, she eventually becomes friends with Terumi's other female companions, becoming best friends with Hanada over their shared shyness and awkwardness for large breasts. She fulfills her dream of becoming a voice actress towards the end of the series, last seen promoting a product/show as one of the voice actors. She is based on the Safflower Princess from the Tale of Genji.

The ninth target, who happens to be the oldest of all the targets, Gennai is an attractive dentist who is bright and friendly at a clinic she owns, giving off the impression that she is younger than her true age. However, this masks her true persona of being a narcissist, who loves to pleasure herself while looking at a mirror. Like Miya, she is aware of Kaoruko's research project and doesn't mind using Terumi for herself. Eventually growing to like Terumi, she engages in sexual intercourse with him multiple times in one sitting, learning to like someone other than herself due to Terumi's skill at pleasuring women and his tenacity. Towards the end of the series, she takes on Semi as her secretary. She plays the role of Gen no Naishinosuke from the Tale of Genji.

The tenth target, Ruri is a high school student and sheltered daughter of a local mistress, who strikingly resembles Yuu for some reason. Encountering her at a license training course, Terumi finds that it is her first time in the outside world as well. Marriage proposals have pressured Ruri, resulting in a weariness of men in general. To bypass this, Kaoruko instructs Terumi to cross dress in order to grow closer to her and to protect her from any man with ill intent towards her. Sure enough, Terumi ends up saving Ruri from nearly being raped by her would-be husband, Kurohige. As a result of this, Ruri develops gratitude and affection towards Terumi, though she never discovers Terumi's true gender. She is later seen becoming friends with Nagiko and Akashi, beginning her first year at Shiun University. She plays the role of Tamakazura from the Tale of Genji.

The eleventh target, Tsukiko is Asahi's close friend, who loves writing and reading erotic novels. She becomes Terumi's first female friend that he becomes comfortable talking to his problems about, though she tends to let her imagination get the best of her at times, sometimes with startling accuracy. Like Terumi, she also has a fear towards the opposite sex, though it is more extreme in her case, as Tsukiko cannot come into contact or speaking distance with other men, the exception being Terumi, who she finds as a good source material for her novels, as well as his feminine face putting her at peace. Her fear of men started since witnessing her father go through her underwear at such a young age. Due to Terumi cross dressing to ease her state of mind, as well as taking her to a love hotel to improve her worth as a writer, and ultimately sleeping with Terumi, Tsukiko has learned to slowly but surely trust in men again. This is demonstrated when she is able to speak normally with Murakami, who she avoided before. It's hinted that she has romantic feelings for Terumi, insinuating that she would like to have intercourse with him again in the future. She has a younger sister, Nagiko, who she adores and vice versa. By the end of the series, Tsukiko has become a better erotic novelist, though she never reveals to Asahi how her skills improved thanks to her tryst with Terumi. She plays the role of Oborozukiyo from the Tale of Genji.

The twelfth target, Otome is a quiet, shy and withdrawn middle school student, who is also Shian's best friend. According to her older half-sister, Otome has no interest in doing much anything, despite having the potential to do better if she applies herself. Kaoruko recommends that Terumi tutor her, confident that her nephew can get her to open up in a week's time.  During the week, Terumi discovers, with Shian's help, that Otome loves cats. After promising to reward her by taking her to an alleyway of stray cats that she can interact with as much as she wishes, Otome starts studying more seriously as a result. Along the way, she is touched when she overhears Terumi telling her sister that he admires Otome's inner potential and starts to develop romantic feelings towards him. Later, she becomes jealous when she sees how close Terumi is with Kaoruko, which strengthens her resolve to one day become the type of woman that Terumi would take an interest in, sharing her dream with Shian. Thanks to Terumi's influence, Otome has become more outgoing as a result, willingly taking on Murakami as a tutor without fuss. Like Shian, Terumi does not attempt to woo and seduce her due to her young age. She plays the role of Onna san no Miya from the Tale of Genji.

The thirteenth target, Akashi is an alluring fortune teller from the country side who loves playing with tariff cards. Terumi chances upon her pleasuring herself on the temple steps, embarrassing them both. He makes up for this when he demonstrates that he's not a bad person by revealing his relationship with Ruri and even volunteers to help at her family inn during summer break. During this time, she and Terumi bond over men and women's need for sexual pleasure and she starts to fall for Terumi's inner kindness. For the rest of Terumi's stay, she requests for Terumi to become her boyfriend until the summer is over, desiring to engage in sex. She becomes one of the few targets who Terumi regularly has intercourse with multiple times. By break's end, Terumi confides in her his feelings for his aunt, who Akashi encourages him to follow, grateful that Terumi went along with her wishes. She becomes best friends with Ruri and Nagiko. By series end, she befriends Yuu, who is trying to convince her to join her gym. She plays the role of Akashi no Kata from the Tale of Genji.

Other Characters

Terumi's classmate and close friend. The reason he enrolled at Shiun University was just to be close to Kaoruko, his ideal woman he wants to lose his virginity to. Kaoruko notes that despite Murakami's determination to speak with women, he is ultimately too "pure" to be participate in her experiment. Having lousy luck with women, Murakami nevertheless tries his hardest, though he occasionally shows jealously at Terumi's ease of speaking with attractive women. Later becomes a personal tutor to Otome when Terumi's time as her tutor finishes. Towards the end of the series, Murakami has let go of his obsession towards Kaoruko and moved on, finally having good fortune thrown his way when it's hinted that he has recently started dating Otome's older half-sister. Murakami is a Japanese family name. His first name is never revealed.

Tsukiko's younger sister, who, like her, loves reading about novels, particularly the Tale of Genji. She was interested in what sort of person Terumi is for Tsukiko to speak so highly of him  but is disappointed when she first meets him. Nevertheless, she's interested in Terumi's androgynous appearance and can be a bit of a pervert like her sister. Later she warms up to Terumi. She does not harbor the same fear of men like her sister does. Later, she becomes best friends with Ruri and Akashi and even keeps Terumi's gender from Ruri a secret, noting how much more interesting it would be to maintain Ruri's naive delusion. She loves putting up her thoughts on social media.

Antagonists

A bully from Terumi's middle school, who is the primary reason for his fear of women and milk, due to jealously over Terumi attracting the affections of other men, despite her own popularity and beauty. Presenting a bright and compassionate persona to her peers, Tsukasa is secretly sadistic and haughty on the inside, especially towards Terumi. According to Kaoruko, Tsukasa loves surrounding herself with "popular" people and things, viewing them as accessories to increase her own status. After six years, Terumi finds out Tsukasa is a student at the same university and that she is engaging in an affair with Professor Konoe. A brief confrontation reveals that she has completely forgotten about him. Offended that the source of his trauma has forgotten about him, Terumi wants her to fall in love with him and get some modicum of revenge. Terumi succeeds after cross-dressing as a girl and "stealing" away Konoe. After confronting Terumi at a cafe about this, Terumi ends up kissing her passionately, which accomplishes Konoe breaking up with her for good and causing Tsukasa to develop feelings for her former victim due to his new found assertiveness. These feelings increase whenever Tsukasa engages with Terumi and attempts to put him down, with others noting that she's starting to fall for Terumi. Later on, she admits to herself that Terumi has grown stronger since their middle school days, finding that quality about him to face adversity the most attractive thing about him. Ultimately, however, nothing comes of this. Eventually, Terumi gets over his trauma regarding her. 

 An influential professor at Shiun University, who, according to Kaoruko, is the most popular male professor the university has to offer. Despite being married and having a child, he regularly cheats on his wife with other women. His most recent mistress is Chuujou Tsukasa, with the two regularly sneaking off to an abandoned part of the University to have sex. They are discovered by Terumi and Tsukasa threatens to break it off with him. At first, desperate to maintain a sexual relationship with his attractive student, he calls her multiple times to give him another chance. However, this all changes when Terumi, cross-dressing as a woman, successfully "seduces" Konoe's affections away from Tsukasa, angering her. Later, witnessing Terumi and Tsukasa kissing one another passionately at a crowded cafe, he breaks things off with her permanently, subtlety telling Tsukasa to "mind her surroundings". This causes Terumi to condemn him in private, noting to Tsukasa that her taste in men is flawed since Konoe is too cowardly to stand up for his mistress' honor, caring more about his reputation than her, effectively shaming her into silence.  Later, Konoe is seen again during the Beauty Pageant arc, and like many of her admirers, he desires to sleep with Kaoruko, betting on the result of the pageant for a chance to sleep with his colleague in exchange for using his influence to help Kaoruko' standing in the university should he lose. Thankfully, nothing comes of it in the end. Konoe does not show up again for the rest of the series but his presence can still be felt; Kaoruko ultimately desires to move from Shiun University to teach elsewhere, wanting to get away from Konoe's influence and allow herself to grow without interference.

Volumes
1 (April 19, 2012)
2 (October 19, 2012)
3 (April 19, 2013)
4 (October 18, 2013)
5 (April 18, 2014)
6 (October 17, 2014)
7 (April 17, 2015)
8 (October 19, 2015)
9 (April 19, 2016)
10 (November 18, 2016)
11 (May 19, 2017)
12 (November 17, 2017)
13 (May 18, 2018)
14 (November 19, 2018)
15 (May 17, 2019)
16 (November 19, 2019)

Reception
Volume 3 reached the 48th place on the weekly Oricon manga charts and, as of April 20, 2013, had sold 24,973 copies; volume 4 reached the 27th place and, as of October 27, 2013, had sold 53,436 copies; volume 5 reached the 24th place and, as of April 27, 2014, had sold 61,646 copies; volume 6 reached the 34th place and, as of October 19, 2014, had sold 35,693 copies; volume 7 reached the 25th place and, as of April 26, 2015, had sold 65,645 copies.

On manga-news.com, the series has a staff rating of 15 out of 20. On Manga Sanctuary, it has a staff rating from one staff member of 6 out of 10.

References

External links

Seinen manga
Shueisha manga